The 1997 Stanford Cardinal baseball team represented Stanford University in the 1997 NCAA Division I baseball season. The Cardinal played their home games at Sunken Diamond. The team was coached by Mark Marquess in his 21st year at Stanford.

The Cardinal won the West Regional to advanced to the College World Series, where they were defeated by the LSU Tigers.

Roster

Schedule 

! style="" | Regular Season
|- valign="top" 

|- align="center" bgcolor="#ccffcc"
| 1 || January 26 ||  || Sunken Diamond • Stanford, California || 18–6 || 1–0 || –
|- align="center" bgcolor="#ccffcc"
| 2 || January 27 || Saint Mary's || Sunken Diamond • Stanford, California || 10–1 || 2–0 || –
|- align="center" bgcolor="#ffcccc"
| 3 || January 31 || at  || Titan Field • Fullerton, California || 5–6 || 2–1 || –
|-

|- align="center" bgcolor="#ccffcc"
| 4 || February 1 || at Cal State Fullerton || Titan Field • Fullerton, California || 15–5 || 3–1 || –
|- align="center" bgcolor="#ffcccc"
| 5 || February 2 || at Cal State Fullerton || Titan Field • Fullerton, California || 5–9 || 3–2 || –
|- align="center" bgcolor="#ccffcc"
| 6 || February 4 ||  || Sunken Diamond • Stanford, California || 7–5 || 4–2 || –
|- align="center" bgcolor="#ccffcc"
| 7 || February 7 ||  || Sunken Diamond • Stanford, California || 6–1 || 5–2 || –
|- align="center" bgcolor="#ffcccc"
| 8 || February 8 || Fresno State || Sunken Diamond • Stanford, California || 0–1 || 5–3 || –
|- align="center" bgcolor="#ccffcc"
| 9 || February 9 || Fresno State || Sunken Diamond • Stanford, California || 14–2 || 6–3 || –
|- align="center" bgcolor="#ccffcc"
| 10 || February 11 ||  || Sunken Diamond • Stanford, California || 15–3 || 7–3 || –
|- align="center" bgcolor="#ccffcc"
| 11 || February 15 ||  || Sunken Diamond • Stanford, California || 9–8 || 8–3 || –
|- align="center" bgcolor="#ffcccc"
| 12 || February 16 || at Santa Clara || Stephen Schott Stadium • Santa Clara, California || 5–6 || 8–4 || –
|- align="center" bgcolor="#ccffcc"
| 13 || February 17 || Santa Clara || Sunken Diamond • Stanford, California || 8–6 || 9–4 || –
|- align="center" bgcolor="#ccffcc"
| 14 || February 18 || at  || Dobbins Stadium • Davis, California || 12–4 || 10–4 || –
|- align="center" bgcolor="#ffcccc"
| 15 || February 21 ||  || Sunken Diamond • Stanford, California || 4–6 || 10–5 || –
|- align="center" bgcolor="#ffcccc"
| 16 || February 22 || UC Santa Barbara || Sunken Diamond • Stanford, California || 8–10 || 10–6 || –
|- align="center" bgcolor="#ccffcc"
| 17 || February 23 || UC Santa Barbara || Sunken Diamond • Stanford, California || 12–7 || 11–6 || –
|- align="center" bgcolor="#ccffcc"
| 18 || February 25 || at  || John Smith Field • Sacramento, California || 18–4 || 12–6 || –
|- align="center" bgcolor="#ccffcc"
| 19 || February 28 || || Sunken Diamond • Stanford, California || 4–0 || 13–6 || 1–0
|-

|- align="center" bgcolor="#ccffcc"
| 20 || March 1 || Southern California || Sunken Diamond • Stanford, California || 5–4 || 14–6 || 2–0
|- align="center" bgcolor="#ccffcc"
| 21 || March 2 || Southern California || Sunken Diamond • Stanford, California || 22–13 || 15–6 || 3–0
|- align="center" bgcolor="#ccffcc"
| 22 || March 4 ||  || Dante Benedetti Diamond at Max Ulrich Field • San Francisco, California || 8–7 || 16–6 || 3–0
|- align="center" bgcolor="#ccffcc"
| 23 || March 7 || at  || Packard Stadium • Tempe, Arizona || 11–9 || 17–6 || 4–0
|- align="center" bgcolor="#ccffcc"
| 24 || March 8 || at Arizona State || Packard Stadium • Tempe, Arizona || 10–4 || 18–6 || 5–0
|- align="center" bgcolor="#ffcccc"
| 25 || March 9 || at Arizona State || Packard Stadium • Tempe, Arizona || 8–12 || 18–7 || 5–1
|- align="center" bgcolor="#ccffcc"
| 26 || March 22 ||  || Sunken Diamond • Stanford, California || 6–5 || 19–7 || 6–1
|- align="center" bgcolor="#ccffcc"
| 27 || March 23 || at California || Evans Diamond • Berkeley, California || 20–5 || 20–7 || 7–1
|- align="center" bgcolor="#ccffcc"
| 28 || March 24 || California || Sunken Diamond • Stanford, California || 16–4 || 21–7 || 8–1
|- align="center" bgcolor="#ccffcc"
| 29 || March 27 || at  || Jerry Kindall Field at Frank Sancet Stadium • Tucson, Arizona || 10–3 || 22–7 || 9–1
|- align="center" bgcolor="#ffcccc"
| 30 || March 28 || at Arizona || Jerry Kindall Field at Frank Sancet Stadium • Tucson, Arizona || 7–11 || 22–8 || 9–2
|- align="center" bgcolor="#ccffcc"
| 31 || March 29 || at Arizona || Jerry Kindall Field at Frank Sancet Stadium • Tucson, Arizona || 4–2 || 23–8 || 10–2
|-

|- align="center" bgcolor="#ccffcc"
| 32 || April 4 || at  || Dedeaux Field • Los Angeles, California || 15–9 || 24–8 || 11–2
|- align="center" bgcolor="#ccffcc"
| 33 || April 5 || at Southern California || Dedeaux Field • Los Angeles, California || 4–2 || 25–8 || 12–2
|- align="center" bgcolor="#ccffcc"
| 34 || April 6 || at Southern California || Dedeaux Field • Los Angeles, California || 10–3 || 26–8 || 13–2
|- align="center" bgcolor="#ccffcc"
| 35 || April 8 || at Santa Clara || Stephen Schott Stadium • Santa Clara, California || 15–4 || 27–8 || 13–2
|- align="center" bgcolor="#ffcccc"
| 36 || April 11 || Arizona State || Sunken Diamond • Stanford, California || 3–4 || 27–9 || 13–3
|- align="center" bgcolor="#ffcccc"
| 37 || April 12 || Arizona State || Sunken Diamond • Stanford, California || 5–16 || 27–10 || 13–4
|- align="center" bgcolor="#ffcccc"
| 38 || April 13 || Arizona State || Sunken Diamond • Stanford, California || 3–5 || 27–11 || 13–5
|- align="center" bgcolor="#ccffcc"
| 39 || April 15 ||  || Sunken Diamond • Stanford, California || 12–6 || 28–11 || 13–5
|- align="center" bgcolor="#ccffcc"
| 40 || April 19 || UCLA || Sunken Diamond • Stanford, California || 7–4 || 29–11 || 14–5
|- align="center" bgcolor="#ffcccc"
| 41 || April 19 || UCLA || Sunken Diamond • Stanford, California || 5–8 || 29–12 || 14–6
|- align="center" bgcolor="#ffcccc"
| 42 || April 20 || UCLA || Sunken Diamond • Stanford, California || 3–5 || 29–13 || 14–7
|- align="center" bgcolor="#ccffcc"
| 43 || April 22 || Sacramento State || Sunken Diamond • Stanford, California || 9–3 || 30–13 || 14–7
|- align="center" bgcolor="#ccffcc"
| 44 || April 25 || at California || Evans Diamond • Berkeley, California || 14–2 || 31–13 || 15–7
|- align="center" bgcolor="#ccffcc"
| 45 || April 26 || California || Sunken Diamond • Stanford, California || 8–0 || 32–13 || 16–7
|- align="center" bgcolor="#ccffcc"
| 46 || April 27 || at California || Evans Diamond • Berkeley, California || 12–6 || 33–13 || 17–7
|- align="center" bgcolor="#ccffcc"
| 47 || April 29 ||  || Sunken Diamond • Stanford, California || 4–3 || 34–13 || 17–7
|-

|- align="center" bgcolor="#ccffcc"
| 48 || May 2 || Arizona || Sunken Diamond • Stanford, California || 9–2 || 35–13 || 18–7
|- align="center" bgcolor="#ccffcc"
| 49 || May 3 || Arizona || Sunken Diamond • Stanford, California || 13–9 || 36–13 || 19–7
|- align="center" bgcolor="#ccffcc"
| 50 || May 4 || Arizona || Sunken Diamond • Stanford, California || 12–1 || 37–13 || 20–7
|- align="center" bgcolor="#ffcccc"
| 51 || May 6 || at San Jose State || San Jose Municipal Stadium • San Jose, California || 5–14 || 37–14 || 20–7
|- align="center" bgcolor="#ffcccc"
| 52 || May 9 || at UCLA || Jackie Robinson Stadium • Los Angeles, California || 9–10 || 37–15 || 20–8
|- align="center" bgcolor="#ffcccc"
| 53 || May 10 || at UCLA || Jackie Robinson Stadium • Los Angeles, California || 8–13 || 37–16 || 20–9
|- align="center" bgcolor="#ccffcc"
| 54 || May 11 || at UCLA || Jackie Robinson Stadium • Los Angeles, California || 9–6 || 38–16 || 21–9
|-

|-
|-
! style="" | Postseason
|- valign="top"

|- align="center" bgcolor="#ccffcc"
| 55 || May 15 || vs  || Sunken Diamond • Stanford, California || 7–6 || 39–16 || 21–9
|- align="center" bgcolor="#ffcccc"
| 56 || May 16 || Washington || Sunken Diamond • Stanford, California || 8–13 || 39–16 || 21–9
|- align="center" bgcolor="#ffcccc"
| 57 || May 17 || Washington || Sunken Diamond • Stanford, California || 9–12 || 39–17 || 21–9
|-

|- align="center" bgcolor="#ccffcc"
| 58 || May 22 ||  || Sunken Diamond • Stanford, California || 12–3 || 40–17 || 21–9
|- align="center" bgcolor="#ccffcc"
| 59 || May 23 ||  || Sunken Diamond • Stanford, California || 3–1 || 41–17 || 21–9
|- align="center" bgcolor="#ccffcc"
| 60 || May 24 || Santa Clara || Sunken Diamond • Stanford, California || 9–2 || 42–17 || 21–9
|- align="center" bgcolor="#ccffcc"
| 61 || May 25 || Texas Tech || Sunken Diamond • Stanford, California || 5–2 || 43–17 || 21–9
|-

|- align="center" bgcolor="#ccffcc"
| 62 || May 30 || vs  || Johnny Rosenblatt Stadium • Omaha, Nebraska || 8–3 || 44–17 || 21–9
|- align="center" bgcolor="#ffcccc"
| 63 || June 1 || vs LSU || Johnny Rosenblatt Stadium • Omaha, Nebraska || 5–10 || 44–18 || 21–9
|- align="center" bgcolor="#ccffcc"
| 64 || June 3 || vs Auburn || Johnny Rosenblatt Stadium • Omaha, Nebraska || 11–4 || 45–18 || 21–9
|- align="center" bgcolor="#ffcccc"
| 65 || June 4 || vs LSU || Johnny Rosenblatt Stadium • Omaha, Nebraska || 9–13 || 45–19 || 21–9
|-

Awards and honors 
Jeff Austin
 College World Series All-Tournament Team

John Gall
 Second Team Freshman All-American Baseball America

Jody Gerut
 All-Pac-10 South Division

Kyle Peterson
 Pac-10 Conference Southern Division Pitcher of the Year
 First Team All-American Baseball America

Edmund Muth
 All-Pac-10 South Division
 First Team Freshman All-American Baseball America

Jon Schaeffer
 All-Pac-10 South Division

References 

Stanford Cardinal baseball seasons
Stanford Cardinal baseball
College World Series seasons
Stanford
Pac-12 Conference baseball champion seasons